Kevin Reginald Molino (born 17 June 1990) is a Trinidadian professional footballer who plays as a winger for Major League Soccer club Columbus Crew and the Trinidad and Tobago national team.

Club career

Orlando City
After playing for several years in the TT Pro League, with San Juan Jabloteh and Ma Pau SC, Molino signed with Orlando City in the USL Professional Division on 18 March 2011. He scored his first goal for his new club on 14 May in a 1–0 win over the Pittsburgh Riverhounds. Following two seasons with Orlando, Molino had week-long trials with PSV Eindhoven of the Netherlands and Zulte Waregem of Belgium in hopes of continuing his career in Europe. However, on 13 March 2013, it was announced that Molino had re-signed with Orlando for the 2013 USL Pro season. On 10 January 2014, Molino signed a new two-year contract with Orlando City which would keep him at the club when they transition into Major League Soccer for the 2015 season despite heavy interest from other MLS and foreign suitors. The deal made Molino the first player signed to Orlando's MLS roster.

Molino began the 2014 USL Pro season, the club's final season in the league, with 15 goals in his first 21 matches, the most in the league at that point in the season. Molino tied the league single-season goal scoring record of 15 shared by Dom Dwyer and José Angulo on 16 August 2014 with six games left in the season. Two games later on 23 August 2014, Molino scored in a league match against the Richmond Kickers to bring his goal tally to 16 for the season, setting the new single-season record in the process. Molino concluded Orlando City's final USL Pro season with a goal against the Richmond Kickers, raising his final record-tally to 20 as Orlando City won its third Commissioner's Cup in four years.

On 2 May 2015, during Orlando City's friendly against Ponte Preta, Molino tore his right ACL and missed the remainder of the 2015 MLS season. On 3 April 2016, Molino scored his first goal for Orlando City from a penalty in a 4–1 win over Portland Timbers.

Minnesota United 
On 26 January 2017 it was announced that Molino would rejoin former coach Adrian Heath at Minnesota United FC after Minnesota paid Orlando City $650,000 in allocation money for the player. The transfer fee paid was reportedly tied for the largest exchange in league history. On 10 March 2018, during the second game of Minnesota United FC's season, Molino tore his left ACL in a match against Orlando City FC after scoring two goals in the first game of the season.

Following Minnesota's 2020 season, Molino's contract expired. On 16 December 2020, Molino announced that he would not be rejoining Minnesota United.

Columbus Crew 
On 7 January 2021, Columbus Crew announced the signing of Molino for the 2021 Major League Soccer season.

On 26 August 2021, it was announced that Molino had torn his right ACL, his second ACL tear in his right knee and third total in his MLS career.

International career
Molino has represented Trinidad and Tobago at international level. He was named in Trinidad's 2010 Caribbean Cup squad, and made his international debut versus Guyana on 4 November 2010.

Personal
In early 2015, Molino received his U.S. green card which qualifies him as a domestic player for MLS roster purposes. His brother, Kevon Cooper is a cricketer from Trinidad and Tobago. He has played for Trinidad and Tobago and Leeward Islands as well as for Rajasthan Royals in the Indian Premier League and in various other Twenty20 leagues around the world.

Career statistics

International goals
Scores and results list Trinidad and Tobago's goal tally first.

Honours

Orlando City
USL Pro Cup: 2011, 2013 
Commissioner's Cup: 2011, 2012, 2014

Trinidad and Tobago
Caribbean Cup Runner-Up: 2014

Individual
USL Pro MVP: 2012, 2014
USL Pro Team of the Season: 2014
USL Pro single-season goal scoring record: 20 (2014)
USL Pro single-season points record: 49 (2014)
Caribbean Cup Top Goal Scorer: 2014 (joint with Darren Mattocks and Kervens Belfort)

References

External links
Aiming to be the ultimate Soca Warrior – meet Kevin Molino

Kevin Molino at SocaWarriors.net

1990 births
Living people
Trinidad and Tobago footballers
Trinidad and Tobago international footballers
Trinidad and Tobago expatriate footballers
San Juan Jabloteh F.C. players
Ma Pau Stars S.C. players
Orlando City SC (2010–2014) players
Orlando City SC players
Minnesota United FC players
Columbus Crew players
USL Championship players
Major League Soccer players
Expatriate soccer players in the United States
Footballers at the 2011 Pan American Games
TT Pro League players
2013 CONCACAF Gold Cup players
2014 Caribbean Cup players
Association football midfielders
Trinidad and Tobago expatriate sportspeople in the United States
2019 CONCACAF Gold Cup players
2009 CONCACAF U-20 Championship players
Pan American Games competitors for Trinidad and Tobago
2021 CONCACAF Gold Cup players